Tajikistan competed at the 2004 Summer Olympics in Athens, Greece, from 13 to 29 August 2004.

Archery

One Tajik archer qualified for the women's individual archery.

Athletics

Tajik athletes have so far achieved qualifying standards in the following athletics events (up to a maximum of 3 athletes in each event at the 'A' Standard, and 1 at the 'B' Standard).

 Key
 Note – Ranks given for track events are within the athlete's heat only
 Q = Qualified for the next round
 q = Qualified for the next round as a fastest loser or, in field events, by position without achieving the qualifying target
 NR = National record
 N/A = Round not applicable for the event
 Bye = Athlete not required to compete in round

Men
Field events

Women
Track & road events

Boxing

Tajikistan sent one boxer to Athens.

Shooting 

Tajikistan has qualified a single shooter.

Men

Wrestling 

 Key
  – Victory by Fall.
  - Decision by Points - the loser with technical points.
  - Decision by Points - the loser without technical points.

Men's freestyle

Women's freestyle

See also
 Tajikistan at the 2002 Asian Games
 Tajikistan at the 2004 Summer Paralympics

References

External links
Official Report of the XXVIII Olympiad
Tajikistan Olympic Committee 

Nations at the 2004 Summer Olympics
2004
2004 in Tajikistani sport